Elcho may refer to:

 Earl of Wemyss
 Elcho Castle, castle, village, and site of former nunnery near Perth, Scotland
 Elcho Priory, Scotland
 Elcho Shield, international match rifle competition
 Elcho, Wisconsin, a town in the United States
 Elcho (community), Wisconsin, an unincorporated community in the United States
 Elcho Island, Arnhem Land, Northern Territory, Australia